Abatemarco is a southern Italian village and hamlet (frazione) of Montano Antilia, a municipality in the province of Salerno, Campania. in 2011 it had a population of 309.

History
The village was founded in Early Middle Ages around the Byzantine church of San Nicola di Mira. It was named after the local abbot of Santa Cecilia Monastery, Marco. Anciently focused on the cultivation of flax, Abatemarco passed, through trades, to various local lordships, until becoming part of Montano Antilia from 1811.

Geography
Located in southern Cilento and transcluded into its national park, Abatemarco is a hill village that lies above the Serrapotamo river valley, between Massicelle (4 km southwest) and Montano Antilia (4 km northeast), and spans on the provincial road SP143.

It is 7 km from Futani, 10 from Laurito, 11 from Cuccaro Vetere, 18 from Vallo della Lucania and 22 from Palinuro. The highway exit of "Massicelle", part of the SP430 "Cilentana" Salerno-Sapri, is 3.5 km far.

Main sights
The Byzantine St. Nicholas of Mira Church (Chiesa di San Nicola di Mira), rebuilt in 1700.
The Chapel of St. Roch (Cappella di San Rocco), the patron saint.

See also
Cilentan dialect

References

External links

 Abatemarco webpage (Montano Antilia municipal website)

Frazioni of the Province of Salerno
Localities of Cilento